Sri Bhaktavatsala Perumal temple is a Hindu temple, located at Thirunindravur, a western suburb of Chennai, India. It is dedicated to the Hindu deity Vishnu. Constructed in the Dravidian style of architecture, the temple is glorified in the Naalayira Divya Prabandham, the early medieval Tamil canon of the Alvar saints from the 6th–9th centuries CE. It is one of the 108 Divya Desams dedicated to Vishnu, who is worshipped as Bhaktavatsala Perumal and his consort Lakshmi as Ennai Petra Thayar.

The temple is believed to have been built by the Pallavas of the late 8th century CE, with later contributions from the Medieval Cholas and Vijayanagara kings. A granite wall surrounds the temple, enclosing all the shrines and two bodies of water. There is a four-tiered rajagopuram, the temple's gateway tower, in the temple.

Six daily rituals and three yearly festivals are held at the temple, of which the Krishna Janmasthami festival, celebrated during the Tamil month of Avani (August–September), being the most prominent. The temple is maintained and administered by the Hindu Religious and Endowment Board of the Government of Tamil Nadu.

Legend
According to the temple's Sthala Purana, Bhaktavatsala Perumal is believed to have appeared to Kubera. According to another legend, Varuna, the god of the waters, had worshipped Vishnu at this place. It is also said that Vishnu, returning from this place and accompanied by Lakshmi, stayed here, which is why the town it is called Thirunindravur. It is also that Thirumangai Alvar did not sing any pasurams (hymns) here, and followed by Vishnu, followed Thirukadalmallai and sang a hymn, praising the deity Bhaktavatsala Perumal. Lakshmi requested Perumal to appear before the Alvar, but when he did so, Thirumangai Alvar had already reached Thirukannamangai. The deity once again appeared in the dreams of the Alvar, who perceived viewing Bhaktavatsala in Tirukkannamangai.

History
The temple was built during the Pallava period of 9th century as seen from the various inscriptions in the temple. The earliest inscriptions of the temple is dated between 820 and 890 CE during the period of Nripatungavarman. There are inscriptions from the later Chola kings like Rajendra Chola II (1051–1063 CE), Virarajendra Chola (1063–1070 CE) and Rajaraja Chola II (1146–1173 CE). The Pallava inscriptions mention this place as Ninravur and some of them quote it as Virudhurajabhayankar-chaturvertimangalam, a sub-division of Punarkottam.

Architecture

The temple is estimated to be 1500 years old. The temple has a 5 tier gopuram at the entrance and two precincts. The Moolavar(presiding deity) of the temple is Bakthavasala. The Moolavar is at a standing position facing east. The Utsavar (procession deity) is called Patharaavi is made of panchaloha and is accompanied by two consorts as in most Vaishnavite temples. There is a separate shrine for Ennai Petra Thayar also called Sudhavalli, the consort of Bakthavasala. The temple also has separate shrines for Andal, Chakratalvar, the Alvars, and Ramanuja. On the banks of a lake a few meters behind this temple is another temple for Rama. In this temple there is a statue of Hanuman, lifting Rama and Lakshmana on his shoulders. The temple is administered by the Hindu Religious and Charitable Endowments department of Tamil Nadu government. The Pedda Jeeyar of Tirupathi is the permanent trustee of the temple.

Festivals and religious practices

The temple follows the traditions of the Tenkalai sect of Vaishnavite tradition and follows Pancharatra. The temple priests perform the puja (rituals) during festivals and on a daily basis. As at other Vishnu temples of Tamil Nadu, the priests belong to the Vaishnava community, of the Brahmin community. The temple rituals are performed six times a day: Ushathkalam at 7 a.m., Kalasanthi at 8:00 a.m., Uchikalam at 12:00 p.m., Sayarakshai at 6:00 p.m., Irandamkalam at 7:00 p.m. and Ardha Jamam at 8:30 p.m. Each ritual has three steps: alangaram (decoration), neivethanam (food offering) and deepa aradanai (waving of lamps) for both Bhaktavatsala Perumal and Sudhavalli Thayar. During the last step of worship, nagaswaram (pipe instrument) and tavil (percussion instrument) are played, religious instructions in the Vedas (sacred text) are recited by priests, and worshippers prostrate themselves in front of the temple mast. There are weekly, monthly and fortnightly rituals performed in the temple.

The major festival celebrated in the temple are Chitra Pournami during the Tamil month of Chittirai (March - April), Tiruadyana Utsavam during Margali (December - January) and Brahmotsavam during Panguni (March - April). The other festivals are Sri Jayanti Utsavam during Aavani, Navaratri, Vijayadasami, Deepavali, and Makara Sankranti.

Religious importance
The temple is revered in the Naalayira Divya Prabandham, the 7th–9th century Sri Vaishnava canon, by Thirumangai alvar. The Alvars have sung praise on the different forms of Bhaktavatsala Perumal. The temple is classified as a Divya Desam, one of the 108 Vishnu temples that are mentioned in the book. Many Acharyas have also written songs on the various forms of God in this Temple.

See also
 Divya Desam
 Religion in Chennai
 Heritage structures in Chennai

Notes

References

External links

 
Hindu temples in Chennai
Hindu temples in Tiruvallur district